Nikolay Godzhev (born 13 January 1983) is a Bulgarian retired footballer currently playing for Sportist Svoge as a goalkeeper.

References

Bulgarian footballers
1983 births
Living people
PFC CSKA Sofia players
OFC Vihren Sandanski players
FC Sportist Svoge players
Association football goalkeepers